Fabian Wegmann (born 20 June 1980) is a German former professional road racing cyclist. Born in Münster, North Rhine-Westphalia, Wegmann currently resides in Freiburg im Breisgau, Baden-Württemberg, Germany.

Major results
Sources:

1999
 2nd Circuit du Hainaut
 6th Rund um den Henninger Turm U23
2001
 7th Groningen–Münster
2002
 6th GP Triberg-Schwarzwald
2003
 1st  Overall Sachsen Tour
1st Stage 3
 2nd Overall Rheinland-Pfalz Rundfahrt
 3rd Road race, National Road Championships
 3rd Grand Prix de Fourmies
 5th Trofeo Alcúdia
 7th Coppa Placci
 9th Giro del Piemonte
2004
 1st  Mountains classification, Giro d'Italia
 1st Tre Valli Varesine
 3rd Road race, National Road Championships
 3rd Giro della Romagna
 4th Gran Premio di Chiasso
 5th Gran Premio Città di Camaiore
 5th Coppa Sabatini
 6th GP Miguel Induráin
 8th Coppa Placci
 Vuelta a Mallorca
8th Trofeo Calvià
9th Trofeo Soller
 9th Sparkassen Giro Bochum
 10th GP Ouest–France
2005
 1st San Francisco Grand Prix
 1st GP Triberg-Schwarzwald
 1st Stage 5 Tour de Pologne
 3rd Overall Rheinland-Pfalz Rundfahrt
 3rd Sparkassen Giro Bochum
 4th Gran Premio Bruno Beghelli
 6th Giro di Lombardia
 8th Overall Volta ao Algarve
 10th Rund um Köln
 10th La Flèche Wallonne
2006
 1st GP Miguel Induráin
 1st Stage 1 Critérium du Dauphiné Libéré
 3rd Giro di Lombardia
 10th GP Ouest–France
2007
 1st  Road race, National Road Championships
 1st Rund um die Nürnberger Altstadt
 2nd Gran Premio Bruno Beghelli
 2nd Japan Cup
 4th Overall Tour de Pologne
 8th Overall Bayern Rundfahrt
 9th Road race, UCI Road World Championships
2008
 1st  Road race, National Road Championships
 1st GP Miguel Induráin
 4th Eschborn–Frankfurt City Loop
 6th Brabantse Pijl
 6th Gran Premio Bruno Beghelli
 7th Road race, UCI Road World Championships
 7th Coppa Sabatini
 10th Vattenfall Cyclassics
2009
 1st Rund um den Henninger Turm
 2nd Monte Paschi Strade Bianche
 3rd Brabantse Pijl
 3rd GP Miguel Induráin
 7th Grand Prix de Wallonie
 7th Gran Premio dell'Insubria-Lugano
 8th Trofeo Calvià
 9th Gran Premio di Lugano
 9th Grote Prijs Jef Scherens
2010
 1st Eschborn–Frankfurt City Loop
 3rd Grote Prijs Jef Scherens
 6th Trofeo Magaluf-Palmanova
 7th Grand Prix Cycliste de Québec
2011
 3rd GP Miguel Induráin
 3rd Grand Prix de la Somme
 4th Grand Prix Cycliste de Québec
 6th Les Boucles du Sud-Ardèche
 6th Münsterland Giro
 10th Strade Bianche
 10th Grand Prix Cycliste de Montréal
2012
 1st  Road race, National Road Championships
 8th Amstel Gold Race
 8th Grand Prix Cycliste de Québec
2013
 4th Grand Prix Cycliste de Québec
2014
 7th Eschborn–Frankfurt – Rund um den Finanzplatz
 10th Trofeo Muro-Port d'Alcúdia
2015
 7th Grand Prix of Aargau Canton
2016
 10th Eschborn–Frankfurt – Rund um den Finanzplatz
 10th Grand Prix de Wallonie

Grand Tour general classification results timeline

Classics results timeline

References

External links

 
 
 
 
 
 
 
 
 

1980 births
Living people
German male cyclists
German cycling road race champions
Olympic cyclists of Germany
Cyclists at the 2008 Summer Olympics
Sportspeople from Münster
Cyclists from North Rhine-Westphalia
21st-century German people